Raghunath was an Indian politician from the state of the Madhya Pradesh.
He represented Sheopur Vidhan Sabha constituency in Madhya Pradesh Legislative Assembly from Hindu Mahasabhba by winning General election of 1957.

References 

Year of birth missing
Possibly living people
Madhya Pradesh MLAs 1957–1962
People from Sheopur